Phenacodes nigroalba is a moth in the family Crambidae. It is found in New Guinea.

References

Cybalomiinae
Moths described in 1915